Calvin H. Blodgett (April 7, 1827 - August 3, 1919) was a businessman and politician from Burlington, Vermont.  A Democrat, he served as a member of Burlington's board of aldermen and was the city's mayor from 1874 to 1876.

Biography
Calvin Henry Blodgett was born in Randolph Center, Vermont on April 7, 1817, a son of Calvin Blodgett and Luthera (Bissell) Blodgett.  Calvin Blodgett was long active in politics and government, including service as an assistant judge of Orange County, terms in the state legislature, and election to Burlington's board of aldermen.  Calvin H. Blodgett was educated in Randolph and attended Middlebury Seminary.

In 1850, Blodgett and his father opened a wholesale grocery business in Waterbury, which they operated until moving to Burlington 1858.  The Blodgetts then became lumber dealers as the firm of C. Blodgett & Son.  Their venture proved successful and grew to include timber lands in Michigan and Canada.  Calvin Blodgett died in 1873, and Calvin H. Blodgett operated the lumber business until 1876.  Blodgett also invested in several other businesses, including Burlington's Merchants National Bank, Champlain Mutual Insurance Company, and Vermont Horse Stock Company.  He was also active in several civic organizations, including serving as a director of the Burlington Board of Trade.

A Democrat, Blodgett represented Burlington's 6th Ward on the Board of Aldermen from 1872 to 1874.  In 1874, he was elected Burlington's mayor, and he served until 1876.  Blodgett's term as mayor was mainly concerned with reducing government expenditures in order to lower the city's property tax rate.  In addition, he implemented improvements to the police department, including regular salaries for patrol officers working nighttime shifts.  Prior to Blodgett's term, police officers were paid based on the actions they executed, such as the number of arrests.  Under Blodgett's reforms, officers on night patrol in the city received two dollars per shift.  Officers patrolling the train depot, waterfront docks, and Battery Street industrial area received one dollar per shift.

In 1878, a period of ill health caused Blodgett's doctors to recommend that he move away from the Lake Champlain area to a town with a drier climate.  In 1880, he moved to Bakersfield, where he resided until his death.

Blodgett died in Bakersfield on August 3, 1919.  He was buried at Lakeview Cemetery in Burlington.

Family
Blodgett was married four times.  His first wife was Mandana Moody; they married in 1853, and she died in 1854.  In 1856, he married Julia Jenness, who died in 1863.  His third wife was Evaline (or Everline) Pitkin Bill; they married in 1865, and she died in 1885.  His fourth wife was Florence Lillian Spaulding (b. 1856); they married in 1890 and she died in 1931.

Blodgett's children included Julia M. (1857-1937), Eva L. (1859-1888), John C. (1861-1862), and Calvin B. (born and died in 1869).  Julia Blodgett was the wife of George A. Smythe and they resided in Pasadena, California.

References

Sources

Newspapers

Books

Internet

External links

1827 births
1919 deaths
People from Randolph, Vermont
Politicians from Burlington, Vermont
People from Bakersfield, Vermont
Vermont Republicans
19th-century American politicians
Mayors of Burlington, Vermont
Burials at Lakeview Cemetery (Burlington, Vermont)